KDXU (890 AM) is a radio station broadcasting a talk radio format. Licensed to St. George, Utah, United States, the station is currently owned by Townsquare Media. KDXU is also an affiliate of the BYU Cougars Sports Network.

KDXU signed on in 1957 on 1450 kHz. It moved to 890 kHz in September 1985; a three-tower directional antenna is used from sunset to sunrise to protect the nighttime skywave signal of co-channel WLS (AM) (class A) in Chicago.

As a Townsquare Media station, KDXU is managed by James English, with program director Andy Griffin and news director Jordan Verdadeiro. Griffin hosts a 6 a.m.-9 a.m. morning show that also features news by Verdadeiro, plus Griffin hosts a morning political/current events call-in show from 9 a.m.-10 a.m.

In January 2022, KDXU began simulcasting on 92.5 FM (K223DI) in St. George.

References

External links
FCC History Cards for KDXU

DXU
Townsquare Media radio stations